The Kerala Administrative Service (KAS) is the  administrative cadre of the Government of Kerala started in the year 2018. The Kerala Public Service Commission conducts exams to recruit candidates for the service. Selection is through a three-stage examination followed by a training of 18 months.

History
The Administrative Reforms Commissions since the formation of Kerala state has been suggesting formation of Kerala Administrative Service. KAS was one of the most important promises made in the LDF manifesto for 2016 Kerala Legislative Assembly election. It is being implemented by the next LDF government. KAS came in to force from 1 January 2018. It is considered one of the major achievements of the first Vijayan ministry.

Aim
The declared objective of the Kerala Administrative Service is to create a new generation of officers to utilize the potential of modern technology to make governance more efficient. The government aims to improve the efficiency of middle-level management in the government service by identifying and recruiting talented candidates through a strict three-stage examination followed by a training of 18 months. The first year of 18 months of training is pre-service training and the subsequent six months of training must be done after entering service but before completing probation. Through KAS, the government is looking for a way to avoid hindering the realization of the objectives of government projects due to the significant shortage of professionals in the second tier of the government system.

The rank of first appointee in KAS is equivalent to the rank of Under Secretary in the State Secretariat. Initially, the second gazetted posts in 29 government departments were reserved for KAS. Officers in KAS, which is considered as the feeder category for IAS, can enter the IAS cadre subject to satisfying conditions of promotion under the Indian Administrative Service (Appointment by Promotion) Regulations,1955, after completing 8 years of service.

Selection
Kerala Administrative Service examination is considered the highest level examination conducting by Kerala Public Service Commission. Selection is done through any of the 3 streams described below:

Stream-1: Direct recruitment
Stream-2: Direct recruitment from approved Probationers or Full members who have successfully completed probation in various departments of the Government of Kerala.
Stream-3: Direct recruitment from Government Employees holding the first Gazetted post or above in the Government Departments mentioned in Schedule 1 of Kerala Administrative Service Special Rules published in 2018 or holding the equivalent post in the general categories mentioned in Schedule 1.

Age Limit and Conditions  
Stream-1: Direct Recruitment = 21 - 32yrs.
Stream-2: 21 - 40yrs old.
Stream-3: below 50yrs old. 
Candidate must have a bachelor's degree in any stream from a recognized university.
Candidate must be an Indian citizen

Appointments
Kerala Administrative Service shall consists of the following categories of officers:

KAS Officer (Junior Time Scale) Trainee
KAS Officer (Senior Time Scale)
KAS Officer (Selection Grade  Scale)
KAS Officer (Super Time Scale)

Criticisms and controversies
Indian Administrative Service (IAS) officials protested against the base salary of Rs 81,800 for Kerala Administrative Service officers. The Kerala IAS Officers' Association and the Kerala unit of the IPS and IFS Associations submitted a letter to the Chief Minister requesting that the Cabinet decision be reconsidered. In the letter, they pointed out that the higher salaries of KAS officers would create problems in the district administration.

There have also been protests against the government's move to apply reservation in appointments through transfer in the Kerala Administrative Service. In 2020, the Division Bench of Kerala High court dismissed a series of petitions filed by the Samastha Nair Samaj and a few officials questioning the Government's move to apply reservation in appointments through transfer.

See also
Karnataka Administrative Service

References

State civil services of India
2018 establishments in Kerala
Government agencies established in 2018